Da Fang (pronounced ), also named Zhupu Da Fang or Zhuye Da Fang, is a Chinese green tea. It is considered one of China's top ten teas by some Chinese tea experts. Like Longjing tea, it has sharp flat shapes and a similar production process. Some Chinese tea experts believe Da Fang tea is an ancestor of Longjing tea. It is more accepted that Da Fang tea is the earliest tea with flat leaves.

Da Fang tea is produced near Lao Zhuling mountain and Fu Guanshan mountain of She County, Anhui Province. Its dried leaves take on a yellowish green colour with sleek and flat shapes. Its buds are usually hidden and covered with golden down. When brewed, the liquor gives a durable fragrance with a sweet aftertaste. Different drying processes separate Da Fang tea into two types. Zhong Huo features a chestnut-like aroma, while Qing Huo features a brisk and delicate taste.

See also 

 China Famous Tea

References 

 

Chinese teas
Chinese tea grown in Jiangsu
Green tea